Basketball at the 2016 Summer Olympics was the nineteenth appearance of the sport of basketball as an official Olympic medal event. It took place at Rio de Janeiro, Brazil, and was held from 6 August to 21 August 2016. The preliminary and knockout round matches for men were played inside the Carioca Arena 1 in Olympic Park which seated up to 16,000 spectators. The matches for women were played at the Youth Arena. This marked the first time that the men's and women's Olympic tournaments were played in multiple/separate venues.

The host country Brazil failed to make it to the quarterfinals of both the men's and women's tournaments, after being eliminated from the group stage. Three countries in both categories took all of the medals: the United States (who took both gold medals), Serbia and Spain.

Competition schedule

Venues

Carioca Arena 1, the largest among the three Carioca Arenas, and Youth Arena, are the arenas that are being used for the basketball tournaments. The Ginásio do Maracanãzinho, site of the 1954 FIBA World Championship and the 1963 FIBA World Championship, hosted the indoor volleyball tournaments instead.

Carioca Arena 1 hosted the entire men's tournament and the women's knockout stage, while Youth Arena hosted the women's preliminary round.

Qualification
The National Olympic Committees might enter up to one 12-player men's team and up to one 12-player women's team.

Hosts
Just as in 2012, the Olympic hosts were not guaranteed an Olympic berth. On 9 August 2015, it was announced that the Brazil men's and women's national teams would compete in the Olympic Basketball Tournament at the 2016 Rio Games after FIBA's Central Board decided to grant them automatic places at its meeting in Tokyo.

Men's qualification

Women's qualification

Men's competition

The competition consisted of two stages; a group stage followed by a knockout stage.

Group stage
The teams were divided into two groups of six countries, playing every team in their group once. Two points were awarded for a victory, one for a loss. The top four teams per group qualified for the quarter-finals.

Group A

Group B

Knockout stage
The knockout stage was a single-elimination tournament consisting of three rounds. Semi-final losers played for the bronze medal.

Women's competition

The competition consisted of two stages; a group stage followed by a knockout stage.

Group stage
The teams were divided into two groups of six countries, playing every team in their group once. Two points were awarded for a victory, one for a loss. The top four teams per group qualified for the quarter-finals.

Group A

Group B

Knockout stage
The knockout stage was a single-elimination tournament consisting of three rounds. Semi-final losers played for the bronze medal.

Medal summary

Medal table

Events

Referees
The following referees were selected for the tournament.

  Ahmed Al-Bulushi
  Steven Anderson
  Scott Paul Beker
  Ilija Belošević
  Chahinaz Boussetta
  Christos Christodoulou
  Natalia Cuello Cuello
  Duan Zhu
  Juan González
  Lauren Holtkamp
  Hwang In-tae
  Damir Javor
  Carlos Julio
  Karen Lasuik
  Olegs Latisevs
  Leandro Lezcano
  Guilherme Locatelli
  Robert Lottermoser
  Cristiano Maranho
  Vaughan Mayberry
  Anne Panther
  Ferdinand Pascual
  Piotr Pastusiak
  Sreten Radović
  José Reyes
  Borys Ryzhyk
  Stephen Seibel
  Roberto Vázquez
  Eddie Viator
  Nadege Anaize Zouzou

See also
 Wheelchair basketball at the 2016 Summer Paralympics

References

External links

 International Basketball Federation official website
 Rio Olympics Basketball Schedule
 
 
 Results Book – Basketball

 
Olympics
2016 Summer Olympics events
2016
International basketball competitions hosted by Brazil
Oly